Manlai is a town in Yuanjiang Hani, Yi and Dai Autonomous County, Yunnan, China.

Administrative division
As of 2016, the town is divided into one community and eleven villages: 
 Manlai Community
 Dong'e
 Nongchangtian
 Datianfang
 Xinguang
 Hongqi
 Alongpu
 Pingchang
 Nanxi
 Tuantian
 Dangong
 Hanjiazhai

History
In 2011, Dong'e Town, Yangchajie Township and Hongguang Farm merged to form Manlai Town.

Geography
The town is situated at the northwestern Yuanjiang Hani, Yi and Dai Autonomous County. It borders Xinping Yi and Dai Autonomous County in the north, Ganzhuang Subdistrict in the east, Lijiang Subdistrict in the south, and Mojiang Hani Autonomous County in the west.

Economy
The local economy is primarily based upon agriculture and nearby mineral resources. Economic crops are mainly sugarcane, tobacco, mango, and longan. The region abounds with plaster stone, iron and gold.

Transportation
The National Highway G213 passes across the town northeast to southwest.

References

Bibliography

Divisions of Yuanjiang Hani, Yi and Dai Autonomous County